St. John's Episcopal Church is a historic Episcopal church at 1 North Market Street in Johnstown, Fulton County, New York. It was listed on the National Register of Historic Places in 2004.

It consists of a rectangular, gable roofed main block and an attached parish hall wing. The main block of the church was completed in 1837 and consists of tall random ashlar stone walls and engaged stone entrance / bell tower. It features Gothic details. Extensive renovations on the building took place in 1911. Located on the property is the grave of church founder and colonial leader Sir William Johnson, 1st Baronet (1715–1774).

It is the second church on this site; the original church having burned in 1836.

References

External links

St. John's Episcopal Church website

Gothic Revival
Episcopal church buildings in New York (state)
Churches on the National Register of Historic Places in New York (state)
Gothic Revival church buildings in New York (state)
Churches completed in 1837
Churches in Fulton County, New York
19th-century Episcopal church buildings
National Register of Historic Places in Fulton County, New York